An energy superpower is a country that supplies large amounts of energy resources (crude oil, natural gas, coal, etc.) to a significant number of other countries, and therefore has the potential to influence world markets to gain a political or economic advantage. Russia is the world's most widely described energy superpower. Other countries sometimes referred to such include Saudi Arabia, Canada, Venezuela, and Iran. The United States is said to be a potential energy superpower because of its large shale gas reserves.

Energy superpower status might be exercised, for example, by significantly influencing the price on global markets, or by withholding supplies.  The status of "energy superpower" should not be confused with that of "superpower".

Energy superpowers

Russia's reserves of natural gas have helped give it the title of energy superpower.  However, this status has been called into question by some. As Vladimir Milov, of the Carnegie Endowment for International Peace, says:

The "energy superpower" concept is an illusion with no basis in reality. Perhaps most dangerously, it doesn’t recognize the mutual dependence between Russia and energy consumers. Because of political conflicts and declining production, future supply disruptions to Europe are likely. As a result, European gas companies may likely someday demand elimination of the take-or-pay conditions in their Russian contracts. This would threaten Gazprom’s ability to borrow. Putin’s attempt to use energy to increase Russian influence could backfire in the long run.

According to Manik Talwani, a geophysicist at Rice University, there are two countries that are most likely to join Saudi Arabia in attaining the status of oil superpower: Venezuela and Canada. Citing their enormous potential reserves (1.2 trillion potential barrels for Venezuela and 1.75 trillion for Canada's oil sands), Talwani believes that they have the reserves to become energy superpowers in the next few decades as oil production declines elsewhere.  However, as Talwani notes, both need US$100 billion or more to increase their production levels up to those of true energy superpowers.

See also 

 Energy security
 Petroleum politics
 Swing producer
 World energy resources

Notes

Types of countries
Geopolitics
Political terminology
Energy policy
Superpowers